Alison Brown (born 1962) is an American musician.

Alison Brown or Allison Brown may also refer to: 

 Alison Brown (footballer) (born 1997), Australian rules footballer
 Alison Brown (historian), British professor of history
 Alison Rempel Brown, American nonprofit executive
 Allison Brown (born 1968), American model

See also
 Alison Browner (born 1957), Irish opera singer
 Alison Brownless (born 1962), British rower